Cyborg Soldier is a science fiction film released on October 7, 2008, directed by John Stead, and starring Rich Franklin, Tiffani Thiessen, and Bruce Greenwood.

Plot
I.S.A.A.C. (Intuitive Synthetic Autonomous Assault Commando), played by former UFC Middleweight Champion Rich Franklin, is the first prototype of a secret "human weapon" program. Once a death-row inmate, he is now a genetically reconstructed, highly trained, deadly assassin whose body and mind have been modified to become a physically regenerative, intellectually superior human being.

While on the run, I.S.A.A.C. takes Deputy Lindsay Rearden (Tiffani Thiessen; Beverly Hills, 90210) hostage. Their lives are in jeopardy from military agents being led by robotics engineer Simon Hart (Bruce Greenwood; I, Robot; National Treasure: Book of Secrets). Deputy Reardon and I.S.A.A.C. work together to expose the military group constructing the super beings.

External links
 

2008 science fiction action films
2008 films
American science fiction action films
Cyborg films
American exploitation films
2000s English-language films
2000s American films